The Garden is a 1990 British arthouse film directed by Derek Jarman and produced by James Mackay for Basilisk Communications, in association with Channel 4, British Screen, and ZDF. The film is loosely based on the story of Christ's crucifixion, except the figure of Christ is replaced with a gay male couple. The film has been seen as an allegory of the suffering gays were going through during the AIDS crisis and their ostracism by most of society.    
The film was entered into the 17th Moscow International Film Festival.

Overview
Lacking almost any dialogue, the film is shown as Jarman's own subjective musings, which are tempered by the reality of his own mortality— when HIV-positive Jarman made the film he was facing death from AIDS. Jarman reads an elegy to lost friends at the film's end.

The film follows a seemingly innocent and loving homosexual male couple whose idealistic existence is interrupted when they are arrested, humiliated, tortured and killed. In between this are nonlinear images of religious iconography — a Madonna (Tilda Swinton) who is overexposed and harassed by paparazzi in balaclavas; a trans woman who, to the background soundtrack of a fox hunt is similarly humiliated and shamed by paparazzi and privileged cis women; Jesus,  who watches the world pass him by; a Judas who is hanged and used as a tool to advertise credit cards; and water dropping from an image of Christ on the crucifix. 

Other images include the Twelve Apostles as 12 women in babushkas, sitting at a table by the seaside as they run their fingers around the edges of wine glasses to create an ominous hum.

It also focuses on what it meant to be required to be viewed as queer in the 20th century, highlighting Section 28, of which Jarman was from the start a noted opponent. The film is augmented with unusually tinted shots of beaches and bizarre changes between classical, Cypriot and other types of music and sound.

Production
The film has a soundtrack by Simon Fisher-Turner and production design by Derek Brown.

Home media
The Garden is available on DVD and Blu-ray.

Cast
 Tilda Swinton as Madonna
 Johnny Mills as Lover
 Philip MacDonald as Joseph
 Pete Lee-Wilson as Devil
 Spencer Leigh as Mary Magdalene / Adam
 Jody Graber as Young Boy
 Roger Cook as Christ
 Kevin Collins as Lover
 Jack Birkett as Pontius (as Orlando)

Other cast members;
Dawn Archibald,	Milo Bell, Vernon Dobtcheff, Michael Gough, Mirabelle La Manchega and Jessica Martin.

Reception
On Rotten Tomatoes, The Garden has a 100% approval rating, based on six reviews, with an average rating of 8.75/10.

Janet Maslin of The New York Times in 1991, thought that the film was an "assemblage of turbulent images" and "is a peculiar blend of reflectiveness and fury". It "has a burning, kaleidoscopic energy" and "genuineness and pathos of Mr. Jarman's own situation".

References

External links
 Time Out review of The Garden
 

1990 films
1990 drama films
1990s avant-garde and experimental films
British drama films
Films directed by Derek Jarman
British LGBT-related films
Gay-related films
British avant-garde and experimental films
1990 LGBT-related films
1990s English-language films
1990s British films